Evelyn Daw (born Evelyn Pearl Shuck; November 16, 1912 – November 29, 1970), was an American singer and actress.

Early years
Born Evelyn Pearl Shuck, Daw was the daughter of Walter Shuck and Edith Miller Shuck of Geddes, South Dakota, both of whose families were pioneers who settled in South Dakota. As a child, she sang in her church choir and acted in school plays. After finishing high school in 1930, she attended Dakota Wesleyan University for one year before moving to Los Angeles to seek additional musical training. While studying voice, she filled in for soloists at two churches in Los Angeles.

Career 

Daw sang in operettas put on by local groups in Los Angeles, and a musician for one of the productions arranged for her to audition with director Victor Schertzinger. Her audition and screen test led to her appearance in the film Something to Sing About (1937), under contract with Grand National Films, Inc. That contract proved to be short-lived when the studio went into receivership and Daw was turned away from the pay window with no salary. She co-starred in the musical Western Panamint's Bad Man (1938) for another studio, but that was the end of her film career.

In 1940, Daw was a "general understudy for the stars" in the stage production Three after Three. 

In the summer of 1941, Daw performed with the Palmerton Players at the Whalom Theater in Massachusetts. Her parts there ranged from a "noisy adolescent" in Fly Away Home to the title role in No, No, Nanette. She returned there to perform during other summers in the 1940s.

Daw sang with the Los Angeles Philharmonic and the Schubert Brothers in New York City. Beginning in 1941, she toured with the J. J. Shubert Opera Co. for 11 years. After she moved to San Diego, she performed with the Old Globe Theatre there.

After Daw's performing career ended, she became a teacher of piano and voice in Covina, California.

Personal life and death 
Daw was married to Dr. Stewart H. Smith; they had two daughters and two sons. On November 29, 1970, she died in San Diego, aged 58.

Filmography

References

External links

 

 

1912 births
1970 deaths
20th-century American actresses
American film actresses
American musical theatre actresses
American stage actresses
Actresses from South Dakota